NGC 1398 is an isolated barred spiral galaxy exhibiting a double ring structure. It is located 65 million light years from the Earth, in the constellation of Fornax. The galaxy, with a diameter of 135,000 light years, is bigger than the Milky Way. Over 100 billion stars are in the galaxy. It was first discovered by Friedrich Winnecke of Karlsruhe, Germany, on 17 December 1868, while he was searching for comets.

Gallery

References

External links
 

1398
Barred spiral galaxies
Fornax (constellation)
Ring galaxies
013434